Tapinolepis is a genus of ants in the subfamily Formicinae. The genus is known from the Afrotropical and Malagasy regions. Nothing is known about their biology.

Species
Tapinolepis bothae (Forel, 1907)
Tapinolepis candida (Santschi, 1928)
Tapinolepis deceptor (Arnold, 1922)
Tapinolepis decolor (Emery, 1895)
Tapinolepis litoralis (Arnold, 1958)
Tapinolepis longitarsis (Collingwood & Agosti, 1996)
Tapinolepis macgregori (Arnold, 1922)
Tapinolepis macrophthalma (Arnold, 1962)
Tapinolepis mediterranea (Mayr, 1866)
Tapinolepis melanaria (Arnold, 1922)
Tapinolepis pernix (Viehmeyer, 1923)
Tapinolepis simulans (Santschi, 1908)
Tapinolepis trimenii (Forel, 1895)
Tapinolepis tumidula (Emery, 1915)

References

External links

Formicinae
Ant genera
Hymenoptera of Africa